Mysore Lokesh (19 May 1947 – 14 October 1994) was an Indian actor in the Kannada film industry. His films include Bandhana (1984), Gajapathi Garvabhanga (1989), S. P. Sangliyana Part 2 (1990), Mathe Haditu Kogile (1990). He did comedic and villainous roles in most films.

Allegedly, he had an affair with a dubbing artist named Sarvamangala, who was the wife of actor Dingri Nagraj. And he committed suicide along with her.￼

Career
He was a part of more than three hundred films.

Selected filmography

 Karnana Sampatthu (2005)
 Prema Geethe (1997)
 Keralida Sarpa (1994)
 Nyayakkagi Saval (1994)
 Abhijith (1993)
 Praana Snehitha (1993)
 Wanted (1993)
 Aathma Bandhana (1992)
 Gharshane (1992)
 Goonda Rajya (1992)
 Hatamari Hennu Kiladi Gandu (1992)
 Hendtheere Hushar (1992)
 Megha Mandara (1992)
 Mysore Jaana (1992) 
 Ravivarma (1992) 
 Shivanaga (1992) 
 Solillada Saradara (1992) 
 Tharle Nan Maga (1992) 
 Edurmaneli Ganda Pakkadmaneli Hendthi (1992) 
 Kranthi Gandhi (1992) 
 Gandharva (1992) 
 Pruthviraj (1992) 
 Prajegalu Prabhugalu (1992) 
 Samarasimha (1992)  
 Hosa Kalla Hale Kulla (1992) 
 Anatha Rakshaka (1991) 
 Aranyadalli Abhimanyu (1991) 
 Bhairavi (1991) 
 Elukoti Marthanda Bhairava (1991) 
 Golmaal Radhakrishna 2 (1991) 
 Hosamane Aliya (1991) 
 Ibbaru Hendira Muddina Police (1991) 
 Kalla Malla (1991) 
 Kaliyuga Bheema (1991) 
 Kitturina Huli (1991) 
 Kollur Kala (1991) 
 Lion Jagapathi Rao (1991) 
 Maneli Ili Beedeeli Huli (1991) 
 Nanagu Hendthi Beku (1991) 
 Ramachaari (1991) 
 Ranachandi (1991) 
 Shivaraj (1991) 
 Shwethaagni (1991) 
 Sri Nanjundeshwara Mahime (1991) 
 Sundara Kanda (1991) 
 Thavarumane Udugore (1991) 
 Varagala Bete (1991) 
 Veerappan (1991) 
 Aata Bombata (1990) 
 Abhimanyu (1990) 
 Agni Divya (1990)  
 Ashoka Chakra (1990) 
 Baare Nanna Muddina Rani (1990) 
 Bhale Chathura (1990) 
 Challenge Gopalakrishna (1990) 
 Golmaal Radhakrishna (1990) 
 Hosa Jeevana (1990) 
 Ivalentha Hendthi (1990) 
 Kiladi Thatha (1990) 
 Mathsara (1990) 
 Mathe Haditu Kogile (1990) 
 Neene Nanna Jeeva (1990) 
 Nigooda Rahasya (1990) 
 Poli Kitty (1990) 
 Policena Hendthi (1990) 
 Ranabheri (1990) 
 Rani Maharani (1990) 
 Rudra Thandava (1990) 
 S. P. Sangliyana Part 2 (1990) 
 Sri Satyanarayana Pooja Phala (1990) 
 Swarna Samsara (1990) 
 Adrushta Rekhe (1989) 
 Amaanusha (1989) 
 Avane Nanna Ganda (1989) 
 Avathara Purusha (1989) 
 Bala Hombale (1989) 
 Deva (1989) 
 Gajapathi Garvabhanga (1989) 
 Hrudaya Geethe (1989) 
 Inspector Vikram (1989) 
 Jayabheri (1989) 
 Jacky (1989) 
 Kindari Jogi (1989) 
 Madhuri (1989) 
 Manmatha Raja (1989) 
 Muthinantha Manushya (1989) 
 Nanjundi Kalyana (1989) 
 Nyayakkaagi Naanu (1989) 
 Ondagi Balu (1989) 
 Poli Huduga (1989) 
 Preyasi Preethisu (1989) 
 Rudra (1989) 
 Thayigobba Tharle Maga (1989) 
 Anjada Gandu (1988) 
 Arjun (1988) 
 Daada (1988) 
 December 31 (1988) 
 Jana Nayaka (1988) 
 Krishna Rukmini (1988) 
 Mahadasohi Sharana Basava (1988) 
 Matru Devo Bhava (1988) 
 Matru Vatsalya (1988) 
 Nava Bharatha (1988) 
 Nee Nanna Daiva (1988) 
 Olavina Aasare (1988) 
 Ramanna Shamanna (1988) 
 Shanthi Nivasa (1988) 
 Vijaya Khadga (1988) 
 Oorigitta Kolli (1988) 
 Aapadbandhava (1987) 
 Anthima Ghatta (1987) 
 Anthima Theerpu (1987) 
 Bazar Bheema (1987) 
 Jayasimha (1987) 
 Jeevana Jyothi (1987) 
 Kurukshethra (1987) 
 Nyaayakke Shikshe (1987) 
 Sangrama (1987) 
 Shubha Milana (1987) 
 Belli Naaga (1986) 
 Bete (1986) 
 Bhagyada Lakshmi Baramma (1986) 
 Ee Jeeva Ninagagi (1986) 
 Krishna Nee Begane Baro (1986) 
 Maneye Manthralaya (1985) 
 Mrugaalaya (1986) 
 Nannavaru (1986) 
 Prema Gange (1986) 
 Ratha Sapthami (1986) 
 Sathkara (1986) 
 Sundara Swapnagalu (1986) 
 Devara Mane (1985) 
 Giri Baale (1985) 
 Goonda Guru (1985) 
 Guru Jagadguru (1985) 
 Jwaalamukhi (1985) 
 Nee Thanda Kanike (1985) 
 Pithamaha (1985) 
 Thulasidala (1985) 
 Bandhana (1984) 
 Benki Birugali (1984) 
 Indina Bharatha (1984) 
 Mooru Janma (1984) 
 Olavu Moodidaga (1984) 
 Samayada Gombe (1984) 
 Sidilu (1984) 
 Prema Jyothi (1983) 
 Benkiya Bale (1983) 
 Bhaktha Prahlada (1983) 
 Eradu Nakshatragalu (1983) 
 Gayathri Maduve (1983) 
 Geluvu Nannade (1983) 
 Hosa Theerpu (1983) 
 Ibbani Karagithu (1983) 
 Kaamana Billu (1983) 
 Mududida Tavare Aralithu (1983) 
 Prema Yuddha (1983) 
 Baadada Hoo (1982) 
 Chellida Raktha (1982) 
 Hosa Belaku (1982) 
 Maanasa Sarovara (1982) 
 Shankar Sundar (1982) 
 Gaali Maathu (1981) 
 Koodi Balidare Swarga Sukha (1981) 
 Leader Vishwanath (1981) 
 Maha Prachandaru (1981) 
 Muniyana Madari (1981) 
 Rusthum Jodi (1980) 
 Chandanada Gombe (1979)

See also

List of people from Karnataka
Cinema of Karnataka
List of Indian film actors
Cinema of India

References

External links

Male actors in Kannada cinema
Indian male film actors
Male actors from Karnataka
20th-century Indian male actors
21st-century Indian male actors
1947 births
1994 deaths